West is a 2013 German drama film directed by Christian Schwochow and written by his mother Heide Schwochow. The film is based on the German novel Lagerfeuer by Julia Franck. Westen had its premiere at the 25th Montreal World Film Festival and was released in the United States on November 7, 2014.

Plot
The film tells the story of the East German Nelly Senff and her young son Alexej, who emigrate to the Federal Republic of Germany in the late 1970s, three years after Nelly's boyfriend Wassilij was killed in an auto accident. In the west, she wants to start a new life, but at first she and Alexej land at Marienfelde refugee transit camp in West Berlin. There, Allied intelligence agencies interrogate Nelly and demand information about her dead boyfriend, who is suspected to have been a spy.

Cast
 Jördis Triebel as Dr. Nelly Senff
  as Alexej Senff
 Jacky Ido as John Bird - CIA Agent
 Anja Antonowicz as Krystyna Jablonowska
 Ryszard Ronczewski as Jakub as Krystynas Vater
  as Gerd Becker
 Polina Voskresenskaya as Jelena
 Alexander Scheer as Hans Pischke
  as Pförtner Neumann
  as Arthur Wilhelm
 Tatjana Berges as Großmutter von Jelena
  as Dame vom ärztlichen Dienst
  as Susanne
Stefan Lampadius as Jürgen Lüttich
Gabriele Schulze as Frau Breitscheit
Michael Witte as Joachim Fierlinger
Tania Carlin as Britische Geheimdienstlerin in Zivil
Rike Eckermann as Britische Geheimdienstlerin
Carlo Ljubek as Wassilij
Diana Maria Breuer as Beamtin
Hacky Rumpel as Nachbar
Luise Weiß as Kellnerin

Awards and nominations
2012: German Film Awards - Film Award in Gold-nomination in the category Best Screenplay - Unproduced for Heide Schwochow
2013: Montréal World Film Festival  - Prize Best Actress for Jördis Triebel, FIPRESCI Prize in the category World Competition for Christian Schwochow, Grand Prix des Amériques-nomination in the category World Competition for Christian Schwochow
2014: Seattle International Film Festival - Golden Space Needle Award-nomination in the category Best Actress for Jördis Triebel
2014: German Film Awards - Film Award in Gold in the category Best Performance by an Actress in a Leading Role for Jördis Triebel

References

External links

2013 films
2013 drama films
Films set in 1978
Films set in West Germany
Films set in Berlin
German drama films
2010s German-language films
Films directed by Christian Schwochow
2010s German films